Like Father Like Son may refer to:

Film, television, and theater 
 Like Father, Like Son (1961 film) or The Young Sinner, an American film by Tom Laughlin
 Like Father, Like Son (1974 film) or Massacre Mafia Style, an American film by Duke Mitchell
 Like Father Like Son (1987 film), an American comedy starring Kirk Cameron and Dudley Moore
 Like Father, Like Son (2013 film), a Japanese drama by Hirokazu Koreeda
 Like Father Like Son (TV series), a 2005 British two-episode crime drama
 Like Father, Like Son (play), a 1682 lost play by Aphra Behn

Television episodes 
 "Like Father, Like Son" (The Animals of Farthing Wood), 1994
 "Like Father, Like Son" (Breakout Kings), 2011
 "Like Father, Like Son" (Charlie & Co.), 1985
 "Like Father, Like Son" (Gene Simmons Family Jewels), 2010
 "Like Father, Like Son" (Growing Pains), 1991
 "Like Father, Like Son" (The Jeffersons), 1975
 "Like Father, Like Son" (Taxi), 1981
 "Like Father, Like Son" (Three's Company), 1983

Music 
 Like Father, Like Son (Birdman and Lil Wayne album) or the title song, 2006
 Like Father Like Son (Ky-Mani Marley album), 1996
 "Like Father Like Son" (song), by Lionel Cartwright, 1989
 "Like Father, Like Son", a song by Exodus from Fabulous Disaster, 1989
 "Like Father, Like Son", a song by The Game from The Documentary, 2005
 "Like Father Like Son", a song by the Word Alive from Deceiver, 2010
 "Like Father, Like Son", a song from the Elton John and Tim Rice musical Aida, 1998

See also 
 Like Father, Like Sons, a 2000 album by Matthew & Gunnar Nelson
 Like Father, Like Daughter (disambiguation)
 Like Mother Like Daughter (disambiguation)
 Father and Son (disambiguation)